The Charity Organisation Societies were founded in England in 1869 following the 'Goschen Minute' that sought to severely restrict outdoor relief distributed by the Poor Law Guardians. In the early 1870s a handful of local societies were formed with the intention of restricting the distribution of outdoor relief to the elderly.

 
Also called the Associated Charities was a private charity that existed in the late 19th and early 20th centuries as a clearing house for information on the poor.  The society was mainly concerned with distinction between the deserving poor and undeserving poor.  The society believed that giving out charity without investigating the problems behind poverty created a class of citizens that would always be dependent on alms giving.

The society originated in Elberfeld, Germany and spread to Buffalo, New York around 1877.  The conviction that relief promoted dependency was the basis for forming the Societies.  Instead of offering direct relief, the societies addressed the cycle of poverty. Neighborhood charity visitors taught the values of hard work and thrift to individuals and families.  The COS set up centralized records and administrative services and emphasized objective investigations and professional training.  There was a strong scientific emphasis as the charity visitors organized their activities and learned principles of practice and techniques of intervention from one another.  The result led to the origin of social casework.  Gradually, over the ensuing years, volunteer visitors began to be supplanted by paid staff.

Operations
Charity Organization Societies were made up of charitable groups that used scientific philanthropy to help poor, distressed or deviant persons. The Societies considered themselves more than just alms givers. Their ultimate goal was to restore as much self-sufficiency and responsibility as an individual could manage. Through their activities, the Societies tended to be aware of the range of social services available in their communities. They thus became the primary source of information and referral for all services. Through these referrals, a Society often became the central agency in the social services of its community. For instance, the Charity Organization Society of Denver, Colorado, the forerunner of the modern United Way of America, coordinated the charitable activities of local Jewish, Congregational and Catholic groups. Its work under the leadership of Frances Wisebart Jacobs ranged from work with tuberculosis patients to the care and education of young children and was funded in part by direct assistance from the city itself.

Settlement House movement
The Charity Organization Society can be compared to the settlement house movement which emphasized social reform rather than personal problems as the proper focus of charity.

Efficacy and criticism 
Despite its claims that private charity would be superior to public welfare because it improved the moral character of the recipients, records from the COS' Indianapolis branch show that only a minority of its relief recipients managed to become self-reliant, with the exit rate declining sharply the longer people were on relief. The exit rates are similar to those in late-20th-century public welfare programs, despite the fact that COS only granted relief only to recipients it deemed worthy and improvable. Furthermore, journals kept by the COS case workers and "friendly visitors" indicate that they were not on friendly terms with the relief recipients but described them in disparaging terms and interacted with them in an intrusive and presumptuous way.

The COS was resented by the poor for its harshness, and its acronym was rendered by critics as "Cringe or Starve".

Britain's Charity Organisation Society
In Britain, the Charity Organisation Society led by Helen Bosanquet and Octavia Hill was founded in London in 1869 and supported the concept of self-help and limited government intervention to deal with the effects of poverty. Alsager Hay Hill was prominent from its foundation, acting as honorary secretary of the council until July 1870, and as an active member of the council until 1880:

The organisation claimed to use "scientific principles to root out scroungers and target relief where it was most needed". Annie Barnes joined the organisation and used her own background that people objected to accepting "Charity". The Charity Organisation Society was renamed Family Welfare Association in 1946 and still operates today as Family Action, a registered family support charity.

See also
 Scientific Charity Movement

References

Poor Law in Britain and Ireland
Social welfare charities based in the United Kingdom
History of Buffalo, New York